Navalvillar de Ibor is a municipality located in the province of Cáceres, in the autonomous community of Extremadura, Spain.

Physical geography 
It is 120 kilometers from the capital, Cáceres , and is located in the valley of the Ibor River, being the first town that crosses it after its birth in the Sierra de Villuercas. It is located within the community of Villuercas-Ibores-Jara.

It borders Castañar de Ibor in the north, Guadalupe in the south, Navatrasierra in the east and Navezuelas in the west.

Nature 
The environment is characterized by the abundance of chestnut forest . There are also large areas of scrub and pastures with cork oaks and holm oaks, along with repopulations of conifers, olive trees and oaks. Likewise, the presence of the so-called "Loro" trees is remarkable, this tree being very scarce in the Iberian Peninsula.

Large mammals such as wild boar, deer, and roe deer, are among the most representative of the Navalvillar de Ibor Fauna and its surroundings.

History 
This area was early romanized, as several findings found in its territory indicate. After the reconquest of the area, these territories became part of the Talavera Lands for several centuries. At the fall of the Old Regime, the town becomes a constitutional municipality in the region of Extremadura. Since 1834 he was integrated in the Judicial Party of Navalmoral de la Mata. In the 1842 census it had 40 homes and 219 neighbors.

Economy

Agriculture and livestock
The carved surface represents only 12.1%, highlighting the arable and olive groves. Livestock activity is more relevant, abundant goats, pigs and sheep.

Culture

Holidays 
"Dog Day" or Feast of the Fifths. It is celebrated the day after Carnival Tuesday.
"Day of the Era". It consists of a family and picnic meal held during Easter Saturday.
"The pasture" May 1. It is celebrated with special relevance in the municipality.
Holy Scholastica, February 10. Patron of Navalvillar.
San Isidro Labrador May 15. Party in honor of the farmers of Navalvillar de Ibor.
San Roque. August 16. Navalvillar de Ibor pattern

See also 
 Extremaduran language

References 

Municipalities in the Province of Cáceres